Schroederia is a genus of green algae in the family Schroederiaceae. Schroederiaceae is a monotypic taxon; Schroederia is its only genus.

The genus was circumscribed by Ernst Johann Lemmermann in Hedwigia vol.37 on page 311 in 1898.

The genus name of Schroederia is in honour of Ludwig Julius Bruno Schröder (1867–1928), who was a German teacher, botanist (Algology and Bryology), also Hydrobiologist and Zoologist. He worked as a deputy head teacher in Breslau.

Species
As accepted by WoRMS;
 Schroederia ecsediensis 
 Schroederia indica 
 Schroederia jadayi 
 Schroederia nitzschioides 
 Schroederia planktonica 
 Schroederia setigera 
 Schroederia spiralis 

Former species;
 S. ancora  accepted as Ankyra ancora  (synonym)
 S. antillarum  accepted as Pseudoschroederia antillarum  (synonym)
 S. judayi  accepted as Ankyra judayi 
 S. robusta  accepted as Pseudoschroederia robusta  (synonym)

References

External links

Scientific references

Scientific databases
 AlgaTerra database
 Index Nominum Genericorum

Sphaeropleales genera
Sphaeropleales